Jasmine Adams (professionally known as Jazmin Bean) (born February 7, 2003) is an English singer, songwriter, social media personality, and makeup artist. Based in London, they first gained attention online for their "extreme" makeup looks. They self-released their debut extended play Worldwide Torture in 2019, which was later reissued in 2020 through Interscope & Island Records.

Early life
Bean's mother, Angela  Adams, is a drummer and former member of the punk rock band Fluffy.  Their father is singer Ginger Wildheart. They have Filipino heritage. They have stated that they had "minimal to no friends" and were "often isolated" during high school.

Career

Music
Bean began performing music at age 15. Their first live performance involved them singing while rubbing chicken liver on themselves at a bar.

Bean released their debut single, "Worldwide Torture", in 2019. They self-released their debut extended play, Worldwide Torture, in October 2019, under their personal label Aswang Birthday Cake. It was later reissued by Island and Interscope Records in November 2020 with six additional tracks. A music video for their song "Saccharine", taken from Worldwide Torture, was also released in October 2019. They've released solo singles, including "Hello Kitty" in December 2019 and "Yandere" in October 2020, and collaboration singles "Princess Castle" featuring Cottontail and "Monster Truck" featuring Zheani were both released in November 2020.

Their next single, titled "R U Looking 4 Me Now" was released in July 2021.  

Jazmin promoted another single called "Puppy Pound" via an Instagram post, where fans could text a mobile number on a 'lost dog' poster to sign up for updates for their music.  The record was released on March 25th, 2022, along with a music video on YouTube.  The video was directed by Shan Phearon and Jazmin themself, and the single has amassed over 2 million streams on Spotify. They also released merch following the single 5 days later.

Bean stated on their TikTok account that their next project will be more pop focused rather than metal like their previous album was. 

After teasing snippets through Instagram and TikTok, Bean released "Carnage" featuring Lucy Loone on November 18th, 2022. A music video was also released on Youtube the same day.

Makeup
Bean became known on social media for their "extreme", "doll-like" makeup looks and pastel goth style, which they have described as "genderless monster". They first started doing makeup as an early teenager while trying to recreate the looks of their Monster High dolls. They run Cult Candy Cosmetics, a cruelty-free, vegan makeup brand.

Artistry
Bean's music has been described as pop metal, trap metal, hyperpop, alt-pop, grunge, and horror pop. Papers Jael Goldfine described their music as "freaky", "eerie", and "genre-bending". They have stated that their music is inspired by film soundtracks, including those of the 2019 horror film Midsommar and the 2005 fantasy film Corpse Bride.

Bean has stated that their style is inspired by Hello Kitty, Aswangs, Fraggle Rock, and Tim Burton films, and they have described it as a form of escapism.

A pop-up exhibition titled "R U Looking 4 Me Now" was opened from late November to early December of 2021 in Harajuku, Japan. The pop-up was in collaboration with Hysteric Glamour and featured behind the scenes props from their music videos and their own art.

Personal life
Bean is on the autism spectrum. They are agender and use they/them pronouns. They sometimes wear a chest binder, and in April 2021 announced plans to undergo top surgery. They are based in London. In June 2022, they announced that they had been in rehab for a ketamine addiction and were on the road to recovery.

Discography

Extended plays

Singles

Live performances

Notes

References

21st-century English singers
Artists with autism
British make-up artists
English people of Filipino descent
English pop singers
Grunge musicians
Interscope Records artists
Living people
Non-binary singers
Singers from London
Social media influencers
English LGBT singers
2003 births
Agender people